James Jackson is an American politician. He served as a Democratic member for the 26th district of the Rhode Island House of Representatives.

Jackson was born in West Warwick, Rhode Island. He attended the University of Rhode Island, earning a Bachelor of Arts degree in economics in 1986. In 2019, he was elected for the 26th district of the Rhode Island House of Representatives, serving until 2021.

References 

Living people
Year of birth missing (living people)
People from West Warwick, Rhode Island
Democratic Party members of the Rhode Island House of Representatives
21st-century American politicians
University of Rhode Island alumni